Demerara Distillers Ltd. is a Guyanese distillery known for the El Dorado Rum brand.
It was at one time the world's second largest producer of rum.

Organization
Demerara Distillers Ltd. (DDL) is a publicly owned company headquartered in Georgetown. DLL owns Demerara Fire and General Insurance Company Inc., Solutions 2000, Demerara Contractors Limited, Topco, and other subsidiary companies include Distribution Services Limited and European Breitenstein Holdings BV. They were one of the first five companies to become certified by ISO 9001 international Standard System, enabling export quality goods.

Under government management, DDL became the world's second largest producer of rum. DDL was one of the first state-owned manufacturers to be semi-privatized under the Economic Recovery Program in 1988. 12 million new shares were issued, reducing  government ownership to roughly 47%, although another attempt to issue shares in 1990 was blocked by the government.

In 2006, DDL obtained one-third of the shares of National Rums of Jamaica, which is a subsidiary of Jamaica's National Sugar Company Limited. 

Yesu Persaud was chairman of DDL until 2013. Through his contributions to Guyanese industry, 1983 he was awarded the Cacique Crown of Honour.

Komal Samaroo became the new CEO in 2014. In 2021, Samaroo addressed the threat that the Venezuelan border issue has on "Guyana's supply chain for agriculture and other food products to the region, and even further afield".

In 2016, Bharrat Jagdeo claimed that billions of dollars were lost tax settlement between DDL and the Guyana Revenue Authority. In 2002, a dispute arose regarding a consumption tax of about GY$5.3 billion.

Production 
DDL credits the flavours of their rums to the oak barrels used in the distilling process and Guyana's tropical climate. The aging process in Guyana is supplemented by the high humidity and steady temperature. Rums are blended from different vintages produced in different stills, then aged in oak barrels.

Promotion

Despite international familiarity, El Dorado and other rums have fallen behind other liquors, such as vodka, in successful marketing or an effective classification system.

DDL sponsors countless local events, such as chess tournaments, Guyana Fashion Week, Soca Monarch competitions, and Mashramani events. They were an official partner of the inaugural tournament of the 2013 Caribbean Premier League, sponsoring the tournament's Catch of the Match award, which went to one player in each of the 24 matches who makes a catch.

A 'rum route' was launched by the Guyana Tourism Authority in collaboration with the Caribbean Tourism Organization. The tour includes visits to Uitvlugt Estate and Blairmont Estate and commercial ventures like rum shops, distilleries, and production, as well as the historical connection to slavery and indentured servants.

References

External links 
Demerara Distillers - Official Site
Guide to Guyana's Demerara Rum

Rums
Guyanese brands
Guyanese cuisine
Distilled drinks